Christopher Peter Meloni (born April 2, 1961) is an American actor. He is known for playing NYPD Detective Elliot Stabler on the NBC legal drama Law & Order: Special Victims Unit (1999–2011, 2021–present) and its spin-off Law & Order: Organized Crime (2021–present), for which he was nominated for a Primetime Emmy Award in 2006. He also played inmate Chris Keller on the HBO prison drama Oz (1998–2003) and starred in and executive produced the Syfy series Happy! (2017–2019).

Meloni's film credits include 12 Monkeys (1995), Fear and Loathing in Las Vegas (1998), Runaway Bride (1999), Wet Hot American Summer (2001), Harold & Kumar Go to White Castle (2004), 42 (2013) and Man of Steel (2013).

Early life
Meloni was born in Washington, D.C., the youngest of three children of Cecile (née Chagnon; 1926–2016), a homemaker, and Charles Robert Meloni (1927–2012), an endocrinologist. He has an older brother and sister. His maternal ancestry is French Canadian, and he is a descendant of Matthias Farnsworth. His paternal ancestry is Italian; one great-grandfather was born in Sardinia and another was born in Velva.<ref name=fdr1>Stated on Finding Your Roots, February 9, 2021</ref>

Meloni attended St. Stephen's School (now St. Stephen's & St. Agnes School) in Alexandria, Virginia, and played quarterback on the football team. He studied acting at the University of Colorado at Boulder and graduated with a degree in history in 1983. After graduation, Meloni went to New York, where he continued his studies with Sanford Meisner at the Neighborhood Playhouse School of the Theatre as well as the Center for the Media Arts.

Meloni worked as a construction worker prior to getting his acting break. He has also worked as a bouncer, bartender, and personal trainer.

Career
Meloni worked his way up the acting ladder with commercials, short-lived TV series, and bit parts in a number of films. His first noticeable role was the hotheaded son of a Mafia don in the 1996 thriller Bound. He appeared as Robbie Sinclair's friend Spike in Dinosaurs in the early 1990s. He played criminal Jimmy Liery in eight episodes of NYPD Blue during 1996-1997 and the fiancé of Julia Roberts's character in the 1999 romantic comedy Runaway Bride.

From 1998 to 2003, Meloni portrayed the bisexual criminal Chris Keller on the HBO series Oz. Law & Order producer Dick Wolf signed Meloni to play Elliot Stabler on Law & Order: Special Victims Unit in 1999. Meloni appeared on both Oz and Law & Order: SVU simultaneously until Oz was cancelled in 2003. Meloni was nominated for the 2006 Emmy Award for Outstanding Lead Actor in a Drama Series for his role as Elliot Stabler. In May 2011, Meloni announced that he had been unable to agree on a contract and would not be returning for season 13 of SVU. His character was written out as having put in his retirement papers. After nearly a decade, Meloni announced in March 2020 that he would be reprising his role of Stabler in the Law & Order franchise on a spin-off show titled Law & Order: Organized Crime. Meloni appeared in a crossover event during season 22 of SVU.
Meloni appeared as the character Gene in Wet Hot American Summer in 2001, the puppet-loving pediatrician Dr. Norris in a 2003 episode of Scrubs, and the character of "Freakshow" in the 2004 comedy Harold & Kumar Go to White Castle. He made a cameo in its sequel, Harold & Kumar Escape from Guantanamo Bay, as The Grand Wizard. In 2005, he appeared on Episode 107 of MTV2's adult puppet show Wonder Showzen in a series of parody public service announcements warning of the threat of cooties. He had an uncredited role as a gay hotel desk clerk in Fear and Loathing in Las Vegas.

In July 2009, Meloni portrayed DC Comics character Hal Jordan/Green Lantern in the DC Universe Animated Original Movie Green Lantern: First Flight. He briefly appeared in the first episode of the Comedy Central series Michael & Michael Have Issues, portraying himself for a fake film starring Michael Ian Black and Michael Showalter.

In 2012, Meloni joined the cast of True Blood during the series' fifth season as Roman, a "powerful, 500-year-old vampire who sits at the head of the table of the Vampire Authority."

Meloni played Colonel Hardy, a supporting role, in the Superman reboot film Man of Steel, which was released in 2013. That year, he played Brooklyn Dodgers manager Leo Durocher in the historical baseball feature 42. Meloni starred in the 2014 comedy They Came Together. He stars as John Taylor in the video game Call of Duty: Black Ops III. In 2016, Meloni shot the heist film Marauders.

Meloni starred in and executive produced the Syfy series Happy!, based on the comic book series created by writer Grant Morrison and artist Darick Robertson, which premiered in 2017. The series was canceled on June 4, 2019.

In 2018, Meloni guest starred in two episodes of the FX drama series Pose, opposite Dominique Jackson. He appeared on the third season of The Handmaid's Tale as Commander Winslow in 2019.

Philanthropy
In 2004 and 2006, respectively, Meloni competed in the fourth and the eighth series of Bravo's Celebrity Poker Showdown; in the eighth series he finished in second place, behind Robin Tunney, and ahead of Macy Gray, Joy Behar, and Andy Dick. He played for Feed the Children.

He appeared on Celebrity Jeopardy! on November 10, 2006, defeating fellow Law & Order stars Sam Waterston and Kathryn Erbe. Meloni split his $50,000 charity prize between the Big Apple Circus Clown Care Program and the Montefiore Advocacy Center. He also appeared on the program's Million Dollar Celebrity Invitational that aired on December 17, 2009. Although defeated by Joshua Malina and Harry Shearer, he won a $25,000 charity prize in the name of Smile Train.

Public image
Meloni has appeared in many public service announcements in support of lesbian, gay, bisexual, and transgender issues. In 1999, Meloni jokingly kissed Lee Tergesen (who played Tobias Beecher, Meloni's on-screen boyfriend on Oz) at an awards dinner for GLAAD. In 2006, Meloni was given the Human Rights Campaign's Equality Award, along with actor Jake Gyllenhaal and director Ang Lee, for his work on behalf of LGBT issues. In addition, in 2011, Meloni appeared in the Human Rights Campaign's "New Yorkers for Marriage Equality" video.

Meloni was included in the 2006 edition of People magazine's Sexiest Men Alive.

Personal life
Meloni married Doris Sherman Meloni (née Williams), a production designer, on July 1, 1995. They have two children through surrogacy, daughter born in March 2001 and son born in January 2004. Mariska Hargitay, who co-starred with Meloni on Law & Order: Special Victims Unit, and remained close friends with him, is the godmother to his daughter.

Meloni has a Cubist-inspired representation of the crucifixion of Christ tattooed on his upper left arm, a butterfly tattoo on his left upper thigh, and a Chinese astrological chart of his family on his right lower leg. In 2007, Meloni was inducted into his high school's athletic Hall of Fame as a member of the undefeated 1978 football team, for which he was quarterback.

In 2014, Meloni bought the house used in the television show The Adventures of Ozzie and Harriet.

In 2021, on an episode of PBS' Finding Your Roots'', it was revealed that Meloni is a distant relative of Nancy Pelosi.

Filmography

Film

Television

Video games

Awards and nominations

References

External links

 
 

1961 births
20th-century American male actors
21st-century American male actors
American male film actors
American male television actors
American male voice actors
American male video game actors
American people of French-Canadian descent
American people of Italian descent
American LGBT rights activists
Living people
Neighborhood Playhouse School of the Theatre alumni
Male actors from Alexandria, Virginia
People from Philadelphia
University of Colorado Boulder alumni